Kaluachchigamage Jayatillake (27 June 1926 – 14 September 2011), known as K. Jayatillake, was a Sinhala novelist and literary critic. He was born in Kannimahara, Gampaha District, Sri Lanka and was a contemporary of Mahagama Sekara having studied in the same school. He married Sumana Jayatillake and was the father of four children.

K. Jayatilake was one of Sri Lanka's topmost creative writers of the modern period of Sinhala literature. Using his close observations of village life, Jayatilake was a pioneer in the Sinhalese realistic novel. His first creative work, Punaruppattiya, a collection of short stories published in 1955, was well received. His award-winning novel and acknowledged masterpiece, Charitha Thunak, published in 1963, begins with a scene of peasants working in the field, evoking the intimate relationship between the villager and the earth. In this and other novels, Jayatilake reminds us also of the close-knit society of the village that is guided by common values.

Plays 
Parajithayo
Charitha Thunak
Punchirala
Punchiralage Maranaya
Rajapakshe Walawwa
Pitha Maha
Piya Saha Puththu
Aprasanna Kathawa
Adishtana
Kalo Ayanthe
Maya Maliga
Manahkalpita Vartavak Hevath Ardha Navakatavak
Mahallekuge Prema Katavak
Mathu sambandai
Ekagei Avurudhdha
Vajira Pabbatha
 Katu Saha Mal
 Diyaniya Apasu Yai
 Punaruthpaththiya
 Delowata Nathi Aya

External links 
 The living icon of Sinhala Literature
A critique of K. Jayatilaka's novels
K. Jayatilake, 1926- 

1926 births
2011 deaths
Sinhalese writers
Sri Lankan novelists
20th-century novelists